Xinqiao is a town in  Yongding District, Zhangjiajie, Hunan, People's Republic of China, located  northeast of downtown Zhangjiajie. , it has two residential communities and nine villages under its administration.

See also 
 List of township-level divisions of Hunan

References 

Towns of Hunan
Yongding District